Thomas Hopkins may refer to:

 L. Thomas Hopkins (1889–1982), American progressive education theorist
 Thomas Hopkins (American football) (born 1960), NFL player
 Thomas Hopkins (gymnast) (1903–?), British Olympic gymnast
 Thomas Hopkins (water polo) (born 1984), American water polo player
 Thomas Hopkins (settler) (1616–1684), early settler of Providence Rhode Island
 Thomas C. Hopkins (died 1948), American politician
 Thomas Chew Hopkins (1808–1876), American politician and physician
 Tom Hopkins (1911–?), English footballer
 Tom Hopkins (rugby league), Wales international rugby league footballer